Ziph

In the Hebrew Bible:

 Ziph (Bible), a town of the Tribe of Judah, near Hebron, mentioned as a city fortified by Rehoboam.
Wilderness of Ziph, a desert near the town of Ziph mentioned as the place where David hid himself from Saul.
Another Judahite town named Ziph, south at the borders of the land of Edom
A son of Jehaleleel (1 Chronicles 4:16)

Zif

 One of five words inscribed on LMLK seals, possibly referring to the Judahite town of Ziph
 Zif, a Palestinian village close to Hebron, identified with the biblical Ziph

Hebrew Bible cities
Books of Chronicles people